Adipocyte Enhancer-Binding Protein is a zinc finger protein that in humans is encoded by the evolutionarily well-conserved gene AEBP2. It was initially identified due to its binding capability to the promoter of the adipocyte P2 gene, and was therefore named Adipocyte Enhancer Binding Protein 2. AEBP2 is a potential targeting protein for the mammalian Polycomb Repression Complex 2 (PRC2).

Function 

AEBP2 is a DNA-binding transcriptional repressor. It may interact with and stimulate the activity of the PRC2 complex.

AEBP2 may regulate the migration and development of the neural crest cells through the PRC2-mediated epigenetic mechanism and is most likely a targeting protein for the mammalian PRC2 complex.

Clinical significance 

Diseases associated with AEBP2 include Waardenburg's syndrome, and Hirschsprung's disease.

References

External links